Sex with My Ex may refer to:

 "Sex with My Ex", a song by Lil Peep on his album Come Over When You're Sober, Pt. 2
 "Sex with My Ex", a song by Ne-Yo on his album Because of You